A bed is a piece of furniture which is used as a place to sleep, rest, and relax.

Bed, beds or B.E.D. may also refer to:

Arts, entertainment and media

Film and television
 B.E.D. (film), a 2012 South Korean film
 "Bed", an episode of Men Behaving Badly
 The Bed (film), a 1954 French film
 The Bed, a 1968 short film by James Broughton
 Le Lit ('The Bed'), a 1982 drama film

Literature
  Bed (short story collection), 2007, by Tao Lin
 The Bed, a 1971 play by Sam Cree

Music
 B.E.D. (duo), a Japanese music duo
 Bed (album), 1998, by Juliana Hatfield
 "Bed" (J. Holiday song), 2007
 "Bed" (Nicki Minaj song), 2018
 "Bed" (Joel Corry, Raye and David Guetta song), 2021
 "B.E.D." (song), by Jacquees, 2016
 "Beds", a 2007 song by Lil' Fizz
 "The Bed", a song from the 1968 album Hair

Visual art
 Bed, a 1955 painting by Robert Rauschenberg
 Le Lit ('The Bed'), a c.1892 painting by Henri de Toulouse-Lautrec
 The Bed, a 2008 installation by Will Ryman

Places
 Bedfordshire, England, abbreviated Beds
 Hanscom Field, an airport in Massachusetts, U.S., IATA airport code BED

Other uses
 Bed (geology), a layer of sediment, sedimentary rock, or pyroclastic material 
 B.Ed., Bachelor of Education
 Banana equivalent dose, informal unit of radiation exposure
 Binge eating disorder (BED)
 BED (file format), for genome information

See also
 
 
 Bedding (disambiguation)
 Bed, Bed, Bed, a book and EP package by They Might Be Giants